When it comes to gender equality in Latin America, Nicaragua ranks high amongst the other countries in the region. When it came to global rankings regarding gender equality, the World Economic Forum ranked Nicaragua at number twelve in 2015, while in 2016 it ranked tenth, and in 2017 the country ranked sixth.

Nicaragua was amongst the many countries in Latin America and the Caribbean to ratify the Convention on the Elimination of All Forms of Discrimination against Women, which aimed to promote women's rights.

The Human Development Report ranked Nicaragua on place 106 out of 160 countries in the Gender Inequality Index in 2017. It reflects gender-based inequalities in three dimensions-reproductive health, empowerment, and economic activity.

Nicaragua has yet to achieve overall gender equality. Women in Nicaragua are more likely to face poverty than men and rates of violence against women still remains high.

Nicaragua ratified the Convention on the Elimination of All Forms of Discrimination Against Women on October 27, 1981.

According to the World Bank's Gender Data Portal, participation in the labor force between men and women differs. For the year 2016, women in the low income bracket accounted for 65 percent, men accounted for 80 percent. The middle income bracket accounted for 46 percent of women, and 77 percent of men. The high income bracket accounted for 52 percent of women, and 69 percent of men. A gender pay gap between men and women in Nicaragua exists.

When it comes to farming, there is inequality amongst men and women. 2016 saw 8.5 percent of women employed in agriculture, while 42.9 percent of men were employed. Men tend to own more land than women in Nicaragua. In the rural areas of Nicaragua, 65 percent of women are working on land that they do not own. Due to the fact that more men owned land in Nicaragua, and ownership in Nicaragua is linked to authority, programs in the 1990s sought to provide more women with the opportunity to own land.

History 
Throughout history, the role of women in Nicaragua has been deeply traditional and therefore, deeply unequal. Men and women held really different social roles and were supposed to adhere to common stereotypes, namely the working men and the woman responsible for the household. This was largely due to the concepts of marianismo and machismo, two prevalent forms of Latin American cultural behavior. According to marianismo and machismo, regardless of class, women don't possess the same legal rights as men. Additionally, women are subordinates of fathers and husbands, not allowed to make their own decisions. At the same time, women have to uphold the morality of the family and are responsible for its spiritual development and well-being.

Men were exempt from those duties and not legally obliged to acknowledge and support children or support their families financially.

Out of those circumstances, the rate of female-headed families was several times higher than nowadays.

Overall, women were less educated, had fewer financial resources, were employed in less-skilled, lower-paying jobs and had fewer civil and legal rights than men.

Change through the revolution 
The lives of women in Nicaragua didn't change until the Sandinista Revolution that started in 1979. In 1987, it was reported that 67% of 'active members' in the popular militia were women. Before the movement, topics like domestic violence and sexual abuse were taboo and not viewed as injustice by society. As a result of the revolution, changes in gender discourses, policies and programs promoted by the Nicaraguan women's movement, beginning with the Luisa Amanda Espinoza Association of Nicaraguan Women, occurred in the early 1980s and continued with an autonomous women's movement in the 1990s. The Sandinistas’ reforms in family law, their discourse on women's emancipation and the promotion of the New Man as a proper family man were meant to pave the way for the modern role of women in Nicaraguan society. This decision led to conflicts as men saw their dominant position threatened, which extended the process until the end of the 1990s, when international fundings and a neoliberal government prioritized establishing a new female figure. After the revolution, the Sandinista National Liberation Front party became the most powerful party which makes the multiparty constitutional republic a single party ruled system. Still, the country has to face increasing societal violence against women and violent attacks against the LGBT community, to which police fails to respond.

Equality in health care 
The degree of health care for women in Nicaragua depends on whether they live in the rural or urban area. Overall, the percentage of births attended by skilled health staff was 88%. The number of pregnant women receiving prenatal care grew steady over the past years, amounting to 94.7% in 2012. The maternal mortality ratio is at 0.15%, according to data from 2015.

In 2012, a mother's mean age at first birth was 19.2 years.

Female life expectancy is 8.6% higher than that of men.

Political and public representation 
In 1955, women received the right to vote and be elected.

With the participation in the revolution, women began to have a voice in political decisions, originally their motivation was the will to protect their families.

"Everything that we did was for our children so that they could learn to read, so they could have a better life, then we, with this idea, participated in the Revolution. With the idea that they were going to learn to read, that they were going to learn many things that they didn't know, with this we integrated in the process of the Revolution," Ser madre en Nicaragua (Being a Mother in Nicaragua) 22.

The Nicaraguan Institute for Women became independent in 2007.

The participation of women in managerial and executive positions was 33.9% in 2012.

In 2017, 45.7 percent of parliamentary seats were held by women, which is the highest rate in all middle-American countries.

Legal situation 
In 1994, Nicaragua signed the Declaration on the Elimination of Violence against Women.

In 2012, Nicaragua passed Law 779, which strengthens the protection of victims and creates an avenue for women to seek justice in such cases of violence against women.

Education 
The literacy rate of the female youth (15-24) was 88.8% in 2012 and with that, 3.6% higher than the rate of male youth. From pre-primary school to secondary school, generally more female than male students are enrolled, education is free and accessible to every Nicaraguan. The Gender Parity Index in Nicaragua was 1.035 in 2010, 3.8% higher than the worldwide average.

References 

 
Women in Nicaragua